Hugo Dellien and Guillermo Durán were the defending champions but only Dellien chose to defend his title, partnering Federico Zeballos. Dellien and Zeballos withdrew before their quarterfinal match.

Orlando Luz and Rafael Matos won the title after defeating Miguel Ángel Reyes-Varela and Fernando Romboli 6–7(2–7), 6–4, [10–8] in the final.

Seeds

Draw

References

External links
 Main draw

Campeonato Internacional de Tênis de Campinas - Doubles
2019 Doubles